The men's pole vault event at the 2016 African Championships in Athletics was held on 25 June in Kings Park Stadium.

Results

References

2016 African Championships in Athletics
Pole vault at the African Championships in Athletics